Diallassagou  (Jà:-sɔ̀gû:) is a small town and commune in the Cercle of Bankass in the Mopti Region of Mali. In 1998 the commune had a population of 18,799.

Tomo kan and also some Marka (Dafin) are spoken in the town of Diallassagou.

References

Communes of Mopti Region